Big Train or The Big Train may refer to:

People
 Carl Willis, American baseball player
 Walter Johnson (1887–1946), American baseball player
 Lionel Conacher (1900–1954), Canadian sportsman and politician

Culture
 Big Train, a British television comedy

Music
 "Big Train", a single from Mike Watt's first solo album Ball-Hog or Tugboat?
 "Big Train", a track from David Lee Roth's album Your Filthy Little Mouth

See also
 Bethesda Big Train, an American amateur minor league baseball team
 Big Big Train, British progressive rock group